Choi Min-sik (born April 27, 1962) is a South Korean actor. He received critical acclaim for his roles in Oldboy (2003), I Saw the Devil (2010) and The Admiral: Roaring Currents (2014).

For his role in Oldboy, he won the Best Actor prize at the 40th Baeksang Art Awards, the 24th Blue Dragon Awards, and the 41st Grand Bell Awards. In 2014, he was listed as Gallup Korea's Film Actor of the Year.

Early life
Choi was born in Seoul, South Korea. When he was in third grade of elementary school, Choi was diagnosed with tuberculosis and told that he could not be cured. He claims to have regained his health by a month-long stay in a Buddhist temple in the mountains.

Choi was in his third year of Daeil High School, Seoul, when he started acting as a research student at the theater company. The young Choi was moved by Ha Gil-jong's films and he want to be director. After high school, Choi enrolled to Department Theatre and Film of Dongguk University. Choi changed his career path into actor while learning acting under Professor Ahn Min-soo, whom he forever admired.

Career

Early career 

Choi began his professional career as a theatre actor by joining a theater company named ‘Ppuri’(극단 뿌리) in 1982. His debut was a play named Our Town. Choi was so engrossed in theater that he spent nearly every day in the small theater. In 1984, he was offered the role of Alan in Equus, but was forced to hand it over to the actor Choi Jae-seong because Choi was drafted for mandatory military enlistment.

In 1988, when he was in his 4th grade in the Department Theatre and Film of Dongguk University, he was invited to audition by his college senior Park Jae-ho for Park Jong-won's early film Kuro Arirang. Released in 1989, it was adapted from Lee Mun-yeol's 1987 novel of the same name. It depicts the poor working environment of female workers at the sewing factory in the Guro Industrial Complex. In the same year, Choi acted opposite Son Chang-min who played law student Hyung-bin in director Jang Gil-soo's youth melodrama All That Falls Has Wings. Choi appeared as a friend of Hyung-bin, an art student. He eagerly put a lot of thought into his character's costumes.

After six years, in 1990, Choi was back onstage with the role of Alan in the Korean adaptation of Peter Shaffer's Equus. With this play, Choi Min-sik's name began to be known in Daehak-ro. Writer Na Yeon-suk saw his play, fell in love with Choi, and insisted on giving him a role in her next drama The Years of Ambition. The role of Lee Hwi-hyang's son, who is called 'Ku-chong' in the drama, was originally set to be played by Yoon Da-hoon. The Years of Ambition was a KBS hit weekend drama with an average viewer rating of close to 40%, and it aired for one year starting in October 1990. Choi, who practiced method acting in his portrayal of a tough rebellious child with a human side, 'Ku-chong', enjoyed popularity for the first time in his life. He quickly vaulted from a career as an unknown actor who was lucky to receive 500,000 won a month for a play to a talent who received 7 million won per advertisement.

Choi then acted in Park Jong-won's second film Our Twisted Hero. He received the Best Actor Award at the "38th Asia-Pacific Film Festival".

Although busily acting onstage as well on the small and big screens, Choi was able to finish his studies at Dongguk University and graduated with bachelor's degree in Theater and Film.

Breakthrough 
In 1994, Choi starred in MBC television dramas like The Moon of Seoul opposite Han Suk-kyu. The story depicts the lives and sorrows of the commoner in Seoul. Choi played Chun-seop, a bachelor who moves to Seoul from the countryside, dreaming of success. He fell in love at first sight with Chae Shi-ra, who lives in the same boarding house. However he ended up marrying Ho-soon (Kim Won-hee) who was also from the countryside. The drama recorded the highest viewership rating of 48.7% (MSK survey), and was called a masterpiece drama. The drama's popularity made Choi Min-shik and Han Seok-kyu into top stars.

In 1996, during the filming of the MBC drama Their Embrace, he suffered an injury to his Achilles tendon and, suffering from the after-effects of the injury, took a break from acting for a while.

In 1997, Choi played a police prosecutor in Song Neung-han's No. 3, and then accepted a role in Kim Jee-woon's debut film The Quiet Family. In the same year, Choi back onstage after seven years in Jang Jin's play Taxi Driver. Choi acted as taxi driver and his passengers were acted by Uhm Jung-hwa and theater actors Woo Hyeon-joo, Kwon Seong-deok, Lee Yong-yi, Im Won-hee, Shin Ha-kyun, Jung Jae-young, and Yu In-chon. It was produced by the theater troupe Yu Inchon Repertory Company and staged at the Small Theater of Daehangno Culture and Arts Center in Seoul from February 28 to March 18. Choi reprised his role in the 21st Seoul Theater Festival. He won individual awards for South Korea representative. In 1998 Choi won DongA Theater Award.

In 1997, Choi did two television dramas. SBS sitcom Miss & Mister, which was directed by director Ju Byeong-dae of Asia Network, who is regarded as a pioneer of Korean sitcoms. Choi and Lee Jin-woo appeared as CF directors and assistant directors, respectively . Love and Separation was MBC 122 episodes morning drama that aired from August 4, 1997, to January 3, 1998. Choi acted as title role Kim Chan-ki, a divorced man living with his son, who meets a female kindergarten teacher.I've been in a TV drama for eight years. Then, after being stimulated by the play 'Taxi Driver' in 1996, I was seriously agonized. As someone who dedicated his 20s to stage acting, I was wondering what this is about. Of course, the broadcasting fee fattened my bank account, and my life was so comfortable thanks to it. However, I thought I didn't learn to do this.Since 1997, Choi Min-sik has been walking on a single path in film, and left television behind. There was a trigger here."At first, I acted in plays. Then I got divorced (in 1993), and usually when I do a play, I practice the script for 7 hours. I also discuss. I endured it. It was an analysis and something, and it was not a situation where I could do it structurally. I thought this was not the case. If I had a family at that time, I would not have quit. I thought about the essence of being alone, so I couldn't stick it down my throat. 'Play is What did you start with?' 'What kind of actor did you want to be?' Just when I was going through a divorce, looking back on my personal history, and reminding myself of everything, (Han) Seok-gyu suggested doing No. 3. That's why I boldly gave up."The first real success came with his role of a North Korean agent in Shiri in 1999. The film was not only critically acclaimed but also achieved box office success. Choi received the Best Actor award at Grand Bell Awards for his portrayal. In the same year he also took part in Theatrer Troupe You's production of Hamlet 1999. It was opened on April 20 as the first work of 'You Theater' opening event, a small theater dedicated to performances in Cheongdam-dong, Gangnam-gu, Seoul. It ran until June 20. Then Choi starred in Happy End, where he portrayed a man who is cheated on by his wife. In 2001 he took the role of a gangster opposite Cecilia Cheung in Failan.

A year later, Choi portrayed Jang Seung-eop, a Joseon painter in Im Kwon-taek's Chihwaseon, which was awarded the Best Director prize in Cannes.

International recognition 

In 2003, Choi starred in Park Chan-wook's Oldboy, which made him popular not only in South Korea but also won him international recognition. In the next two years, he played a trumpet player in Springtime, a struggling former boxer in Ryoo Seung-wan's Crying Fist, and a child murderer in Sympathy for Lady Vengeance, the last film in Park Chan-wook's vengeance trilogy. In 2005, Choi and Song Kang-ho were accused by director and Cinema Service head Kang Woo-suk of demanding a share of profits for so-called "contributions" when no contributions were made. Kang later rescinded the statement and apologized.

At various points during 2006, Choi and other South Korean film industry professionals, together and separate from Choi, demonstrated in Seoul and at the Cannes Film Festival against the South Korean administration's decision to reduce the Screen Quotas from 146 to 73 days as part of the Free Trade Agreement with the United States. As a sign of protest, Choi returned the prestigious Okgwan Order of Cultural Merit which had been awarded to him, saying, "To halve the screen quota is tantamount to a death sentence for Korean film. This medal, once a symbol of pride, is now nothing more than a sign of disgrace, and it is with a heavy heart that I must return it." Over the next four years, Choi went on a self-imposed exile from making films, begun in protest over the screen quota but also partly due to the studios' reluctance to hire the outspoken and politically active actor. Instead he returned to his theater roots in 2007. He also starred in the 2003 London production of Martin McDonagh's  The Pillowman, his first play in seven years.

During the retrospective on Choi held at the 14th Lyon Asian Film Festival in November 2008, the actor was asked his reaction to the upcoming remake of Oldboy, and he admitted to the French reporters present that he was upset at Hollywood for using what he described as pressure tactics on Asian and European filmmakers so they could remake foreign movies in the United States.

Choi made his comeback in Jeon Soo-il's 2009 art film Himalaya, Where the Wind Dwells, in which he was the only South Korean actor working with locally cast Tibetan actors. Though Kim Jee-woon's 2010 action thriller I Saw the Devil drew criticism from some quarters for its ultra-violent content, reviewers agreed that Choi's performance as a serial killer was memorable and the film emerged as a box office success. Choi did voice acting for Leafie, A Hen into the Wild, which in 2011 became the highest grossing South Korean animated film in history. In his 2012 follow-up Nameless Gangster: Rules of the Time, Choi played another complex, layered antihero, and the Yoon Jong-bin film was both a critical and box office hit and earned him the Best Performance by an Actor award at the 2012 Asia Pacific Screen Awards. Choi's next film was Park Hoon-jung's New World, a 2013 noir about an undercover cop in the world of gangsters, which also became successful critically and commercially.

For his English-language debut, Choi appeared in Luc Besson's Lucy (2014), in the role of a gangster who kidnaps a girl and forces her to become a drug mule, but she inadvertently acquires superhuman powers. He then played Yi Sun-sin in the blockbuster period epic The Admiral: Roaring Currents about the Battle of Myeongnyang, regarded as one of the admiral's most remarkable naval victories. Choi next starred in the period film The Tiger: An Old Hunter's Tale, where he played a hunter. Choi had two films in 2017; he played an unscrupulous mayor in the political film The Mayor, and headlined the remake crime thriller Heart Blackened.

In 2019, Choi stars in the period film Forbidden Dream, playing Jang Yeong-sil. On December 10, 2021, his contract with C-JeS Entertainment ended.

Venture to OTT drama 
In 2022, Choi stars in the Disney+ series Big Bet which marks his first drama appearance in 26 years since Love and Separation in 1997. Seventy percent of the filming was conducted in the Philippines.

Personal life 
In 1990 Choi married actress . They were divorced in 1993.

Choi remarried in 1999 to Kim Hwal-ran. Choi met Kim through Choi's junior at Dongguk University and the representative of his agency, Jeon Young-min, who introduced them to each other.

Filmography

Film

Television series

Stage

Awards and nominations

State honors

Listicles

Notes

References

External links 

 Choi Min-sik at C-JeS Entertainment
 
 
 
 Choi Min-sik at Korea Tourism Organization
 Choi Min-sik Fan Club at Daum

20th-century South Korean male actors
21st-century South Korean male actors
South Korean male television actors
South Korean male film actors
South Korean male stage actors
Male actors from Seoul
1962 births
Living people
Recipients of the Order of Cultural Merit (Korea)
South Korean Buddhists
Dongguk University alumni
Asia Pacific Screen Award winners
Grand Prize Paeksang Arts Award (Film) winners
Min-sik